TASKING GmbH is a provider of embedded-software development tools headquartered in Munich, Germany.

History 
Founded as a software consulting company in 1977, TASKING developed its first C compiler in 1986. In 1988, its first embedded toolset for the 8051 family of single-chip microcontrollers was launched. The company gained a presence in the U.S. market by merging with Boston System Office (BSO) in 1989 and shortly thereafter developed a second-generation compiler designed to support the C166 and DSP56K.

In 1998, TASKING partnered with Infineon Technologies to develop the first TriCore development software. Altium acquired TASKING in 2001 and they began working on its third-generation compiler technology, the Viper compiler. This compiler technology was designed to increase the speed and code efficiency for the TriCoreddevelopment toolset.

The C166 toolset was upgraded to the third-generation compiler technology in 2006, providing significant increase in speed optimization and code size. 2014 saw the introduction of both a compiler for the Renesas RH850 family and an Automotive Safety Support Program (Safety Kit) for ISO 26262 certification.

The TASKING TriCore toolset received a major update in 2015 and another update in 2017. These updates further increased speed and decreased code size, but the major focus of these updates was additional support for the Infineon AURIX and Infineon AURIX 2G multi-core processors.

In 2016, the Safety Checker product was released. Safety Checker provides static code analysis to verify that no unauthorized access to protected memory occurs. In 2017, the VX Toolset for TriCore v6.2 as well as a stand-alone embedded debugger was released.

Products 
TASKING provides embedded-software development tools for the following processors:

 Infineon TriCore/AURIX
 Infineon/ST Micro C166/ST10
 Freescale Qorivva
 STMicroelectronics SPC 5
 Renesas RH850
 Bosch GTM-IP MCS (generic timer module)
 8051 and others

The most popular TASKING product is the VX Toolset for TriCore. It contains a full set of tools for developing and troubleshooting software for the TriCore, AURIX, and AURIX 2G processors from Infineon Technologies.

This development package includes C/C++ compilers for the TriCore, plus C compilers for the Generic Timer Module (GTM), Hardware Safety Module (HSM), 8051 (SCR), and Peripheral Co-Processor (PCP). Additional tools include a pin mapper, debugger, linker, and assemblers.

Non-compiler tools:

 Safety Kit  a complete ISO 26262 qualification program that inspects the full journey of the software and its intended application.
 Safety Checker  automatically detects interference between software elements with different Automotive Safety Integrity Levels (ASIL) by checking access restrictions on the memory of single and multi-core systems.
 Stand-alone Embedded Debugger.

See also 
 List of EDA companies
 Electronics
 Electronic engineering
 FPGAs
 Embedded systems

References

Further reading 
 https://www.heise.de/developer/meldung/TASKING-C-Compiler-in-Eclipse-integriert-2070820.html
 https://www.elektronikpraxis.vogel.de/tasking-compiler-technologie-gratis-zum-testen-a-501472/
 https://www.elektroniknet.de/elektronik/elektronikfertigung/europaeischer-hauptsitz-nun-in-muenchen-135595.html
 https://www.embedded-world.de/de/ausstellerprodukte/embwld18/produkt-9949953/tasking-vx-toolset-for-tricore-aurix
 https://www.elektronik-informationen.de/tasking-vx-toolset-in-neuer-version/150/23272/348044
 https://www.electronicsweekly.com/news/products/software-products/altium-tasking-tricore-vx-toolset-v3-2-for-embedded-software-2009-03/
 https://www.businesswire.com/news/home/20050222005870/en/Altium-Offers-TASKING-TriCore-VX-toolset-v2.2-Supporting
 https://www.channel-e.de/nachrichten/article/tasking-c-compiler-fuer-mcus-mit-power-architektur.html

Software companies established in 1977
Software companies of Germany
Companies based in Munich
Electronic design automation companies
Development software companies